Petrophile aspera is a species of flowering plant in the family Proteaceae and is endemic to southwestern Western Australia. It is a low shrub with relatively long, cylindrical leaves often curled at the tip, and oval heads of scented pale pink to pale yellow or white flowers.

Description

Taxonomy
Petrophile aspera was first formally described in 1990 by Donald Bruce Foreman in the journal Muelleria from material collected east of Dumbleyung by Alex George in 1978. The name Petorphile aspera was mentioned in an unpublished manuscript by Charles Gardner. The specific epithet (aspera) means "rough to the touch", referring to short, hard projections on the leaves.

Distribution and habitat
This petrophile grows in low woodland, shrubland and heath between Narrogin, Lake Grace and the Stirling Range in the Avon Wheatbelt and Mallee biogeographic regions of southwestern Western Australia.

Conservation status
Petrophile aspera is classified as "not threatened" by the Western Australian Government Department of Parks and Wildlife.

References

aspera
Eudicots of Western Australia
Endemic flora of Western Australia
Plants described in 1990